Grobničko Polje Airport (Croatian: Zračna luka Grobničko Polje)  is an airport serving Grobnik, a small locality near Rijeka, Croatia.

References

External links
Skyvector

Airports in Croatia
Transport in Rijeka
Buildings and structures in Primorje-Gorski Kotar County
Transport in Primorje-Gorski Kotar County